Erdal Bibo (born 8 January 1977 in Turkey) is a Turkish professional basketball player. He finally played for TED Ankara Kolejliler and wore the number 7 jersey. The small forward is 1.96 m tall and 99 kg weights.

External links
TBLStat.net Profile

1977 births
Living people
Turkish men's basketball players
Anadolu Efes S.K. players
Türk Telekom B.K. players
Fenerbahçe men's basketball players
Beşiktaş men's basketball players
Beykozspor basketball players
Small forwards